This is a list of the main career statistics of professional Czech tennis player Květa Peschke.

Performance timelines

Singles

Doubles

Mixed doubles

Notes
 At the 2008 Australian Open, Peschke and Martin Damm withdrew before their quarterfinal match, this is not counted as a loss.
At the 2008 Wimbledon Championships, Peschke and Pavel Vízner received a third round walkover, this is not counted as a win.
At the 2013 Australian Open, Peschke and Marcin Matkowski received a second round walkover, this is not counted as a win.
At the 2021 Wimbledon Championships, Peschke and Kevin Krawietz received second and third round walkovers, these are not counted as wins.

Grand Slam tournament finals

Doubles: 3 (1 title, 2 runner-ups)

Mixed doubles: 3 (3 runner-ups)

Other significant finals

Year-end championships finals

Doubles: 3 runner-ups

WTA career finals

Singles: 2 (1 title, 1 runner-up)

Doubles: 78 (36 titles, 42 runner-ups)

ITF Circuit finals

Singles: 16 (10 titles, 6 runner–ups)

Doubles: 12 (8–4)

External links
 
 
 

Peschke